Valiabad (also Romanized as Valīābād; also known as Walīābāb) is a village in Zahray-ye Bala Rural District, in the Central District of Buin Zahra County, Qazvin Province, Iran. At the 2006 census, its population was 904, in 234 families.

References 

Populated places in Buin Zahra County